Apocryphini is a tribe of darkling beetles in the family Tenebrionidae. There are at least four genera in Apocryphini.

Genera
These genera belong to the tribe Apocryphini:
 Apocrypha Eschscholtz, 1831  (North America and the Neotropics)
 Diplocyrtus Quedenfeldt, 1887  (the Palearctic)
 Plastica C.O. Waterhouse, 1903  (the Neotropics)
 Pseudapocrypha Champion, 1886  (the Neotropics)

References

Further reading

 
 

Tenebrionoidea